List of TV stations in Ghana is the list various television stations in Ghana.

Greater Accra Region 
 Pent Tv
 Konkonsa TV
 Adom TV
 Agoo TV
 Ashaiman TV
 Atinka TV
Bryt TV
 Citi TV
 Crystal TV
 DGN
 e.tv Ghana
 EGM TV GH
 Family TV
 GHOne TV
 GTV
 GBC 2
 Homebase TV
 Kantanka TV
 Max TV
 Metro TV
 Net 2 TV
 Obonu TV
 Oceans TV
 Onua TV
 Pan-African TV
 Praise TV
Trotro TV
 TV Africa
 TV XYZ
 TV3
 TV 7
 UTV
 Zylofon TV
 Joy Prime
4Syte TV
 LwPlus TV in
Dominion TV
3Music TV

Ashanti Region 

 ATV
 Kessben TV
 
 ZTV
GC TV

Northern Region 
NTV
Sagani TV
Might TV
Zaa TV
Saha TV
Eeman Dawah TV
Discovery Television (fmr)

References

External links
TV Stations in Ghana (GhanaWeb)

EGM TV GH